Abdelrahman Darwish is an Egyptian taekwondo practitioner.

In 2018, at the African Taekwondo Championships held in Agadir, Morocco, he won one of the bronze medals in the men's 87 kg event.

He represented Egypt at the 2019 African Games held in Rabat, Morocco and he won the silver medal in the men's +87 kg event.

References

External links
 

Living people
Year of birth missing (living people)
Place of birth missing (living people)
Egyptian male taekwondo practitioners
African Games medalists in taekwondo
African Games silver medalists for Egypt
Competitors at the 2019 African Games
African Taekwondo Championships medalists
21st-century Egyptian people